Haemanota prophaea is a moth of the family Erebidae. It was described by William Schaus in 1905. It is found from French Guiana in South America to Arizona in the southern United States.

References

Haemanota
Moths described in 1905